"Peter Gunn" is the theme music composed by Henry Mancini for the television show of the same name. The song was the opening track on the original soundtrack album, The Music from Peter Gunn, released in 1959. Mancini won an Emmy Award and two Grammys for Album of the Year and Best Arrangement.

Recording and releases
In his 1989 autobiography, Did They Mention the Music?, Mancini states:
Mancini arranged the first single version of the song for trumpeter Ray Anthony in 1959. Recorded for Capitol Records at Radio Recorders and featuring tenor saxophonist Plas Johnson, it reached number eight on the Billboard Hot 100, number 12 on the R&B chart, and number 13 in Canada.

Mancini has recorded several different versions of his theme music including "Señor Peter Gunn" on his 1965 album, The Latin Sound of Henry Mancini, and in a new arrangement for the 1967 movie Gunn...Number One!.

Lyrics were added by Jay Livingston and Ray Evans and first recorded in 1965 by Sarah Vaughan in an arrangement by Bill Holman on her album Sarah Vaughan Sings the Mancini Songbook. Mancini also recorded a vocal version titled "Bye Bye" that is on his 1967 soundtrack album Gunn...Number One!.

Other charting versions
In addition to the many different arrangements of the "Peter Gunn" theme recorded by Mancini, the music has also been recorded by numerous other artists.  Versions that reached the record charts include:
 An instrumental version by guitarist Duane Eddy reached number six on the UK Singles Chart on June 25, 1959, and number 27 on the Billboard Hot 100 on November 14, 1960.
 Deodato released a version of the song in 1976, which reached number 20 on the US dance chart, number 84 on the Billboard Hot 100, and number 96 on the R&B chart.
 Art of Noise released a version of the song featuring Eddy in 1986, which reached number two on the US dance chart, number eight in the UK, number 14 in Canada, and number 50 on the Billboard Hot 100. It was featured on their 1986 album In Visible Silence, and was awarded a Grammy for Best Rock Instrumental Performance. In Canada, the song spent 20 weeks in the top 100, and was number 84 in the year-end chart.
The B-52's adapted Mancini's ostinato or riff and added lyrics for their song "Planet Claire". It is used as the opening track on the group's 1979 self-titled debut album. In AllMusic review, Stewart Mason describes the instrumental opening to the song as "space sounds blend[ing] into a jumpy, speeded-up version of Henry Mancini's 'Peter Gunn' theme mixed with sounds that could have been lifted from one of Joe Meek's 'Telstar' follow-ups, followed by a lengthy wordless vocal and organ section that recalls the theme from Star Trek."  Released on an EP, it reached number 24 on Billboard's Disco Hot 100 chart.

References

1958 songs
1959 singles
1976 singles
1979 singles
1980 singles
1986 singles
Songs with music by Henry Mancini
Duane Eddy songs
Aretha Franklin songs
The Blues Brothers songs
Art of Noise songs
Song recordings produced by Lee Hazlewood
Song recordings produced by Lester Sill
Atlantic Records singles
Capitol Records singles
Decca Records singles
MCA Records singles
Television drama theme songs
Songs from television series
Jamie Records singles
1950s instrumentals
Emerson, Lake & Palmer songs